Sally Davies may refer to:

 Sally Davies (artist) (born 1956), Canadian painter and photographer, based in New York City
 Dame Sally Davies (doctor) (born 1949), British doctor, and former Chief Medical Officer